Serena Williams defeated the defending champion Maria Sharapova in the final, 6–4, 6–4 to win the women's singles tennis title at the 2013 French Open. It was her second French Open singles title, her 16th major singles title overall, and she completed the double career Grand Slam in singles with the win. She also became the oldest woman to win the French Open (a record she later surpassed herself in 2015) and set a record for the longest gap between successive French Open titles (her last being in 2002). With the win, Williams extended her winning streak to 31 matches (dating back to the Miami Open), going undefeated for the 2013 clay court season. She lost only one set during the tournament, to Svetlana Kuznetsova in the quarterfinals.

The final marked the first time the top two seeds contested the French Open final since 1995, and the first time overall at a major since the 2004 Australian Open.

This tournament marked the major main-draw debut of future Olympic gold medalist Monica Puig; she lost to Carla Suárez Navarro in the third round.

Seeds

Qualifying

Draw

Finals

Top half

Section 1

Section 2

Section 3

Section 4

Bottom half

Section 5

Section 6

Section 7

Section 8

Road to the final
Since winning the French Open in 2002, Serena Williams had not advanced to the final of the event, last semifinal was in 2003 (lost to Henin). In 2008, she was the only former champion left in the draw, she lost to Katarina Srebotnik in the third round. In 2012, she lost in the first round to Virginie Razzano, a player ranked in the 100s. In 2013, however, she made quick work of her opponents advancing to the finals with an average match length of less than one hour and fifteen minutes. She had problems in just one match, in quarterfinals against Svetlana Kuznetsova, when she was down 2–0 and break points in third set. However, she won six of last seven games to close out the match.

After reaching quarterfinals without dropping set, Sharapova needed two three-setters to reach final. First, she met 18th seed Jelena Janković and dropped the first set 6–0. In that set Sharapova committed 20 errors to just two from Jankovic. However, Jankovic lost her opening service game in the second set, which looked to be key for Sharapova as she could cool down after a horrible first set. In the semifinal she faced third seed Victoria Azarenka. Sharapova won the first set convincingly, but lost the second in the same fashion. But she eventually eased to a 5–2 lead in the final set and finished the match two games later to reach her second French Open final.

Final
First seeded Williams faced off against second seeded Maria Sharapova in the women's singles final.  Williams came out aggressive, charging the net on the first point.  Her aggression set up a triple break-point, but Sharapova fought back and held serve.  She then broke Williams for a 2–0 lead.  Williams broke back in the next game, then broke Sharapova twice more for a 6–4 first set.  In the second set, Sharapova fought off five break points to hold in her opening serve.  After Williams held serve, Sharapova dropped a break with two consecutive errors in the fourth game.  From there, Williams went on to take a 5–4 lead with her serve coming up.  She finished off the match with her tenth ace of the day.  "She's always had a big serve," said Sharapova. "I think her second serve is better than it was in the past."

For Williams, it was her 31st consecutive victory, a career best.  She has beaten Sharapova 13 times in a row.  When asked by a reporter if  she still wanted to retire at her peak, Williams replied "That's my goal, but have I peaked yet?"  Commentary by Simon Briggs published by The Daily Telegraph described Williams' performance as "almost flawless".  "Sharapova actually played a fine match," said Briggs. "But it is so difficult to attack an in-form Williams because she can shut you down with the quality of her serve."

By winning the 1 hour 46 minute match, Williams completed her second career Grand Slam.  It was her 16th major title overall, moving her within six of Steffi Graf's modern era record of 22 such wins, and within eight of Margaret Court's all-time record.  She also became the oldest women ever to win the French Open.

Championship match statistics

References

External links
 Main Draw
2013 French Open – Women's draws and results at the International Tennis Federation

Women's Singles
French Open by year – Women's singles
French Open - Women's Singles
2013 in women's tennis
2013 in French women's sport